This page shows the Kazakhstan national football team's results in International Matches, as recognized by FIFA:

Overview of results

Results by decades

Best / Worst Results

Best

Worst

International matches

1992–1999

1992

1994

1995

1996

1997

1998

2000–2009

2000

2001

2002

2003

2004

2005

2006

2007

2008

2009

2010–2019

2010

2011

2012

2013

2014

2015

2016

2017

2018

2019

2020–2029

2020

2021

2022

Record versus other countries

International goalscorers

All goalscorers from International Matches.
13 goals

Ruslan Baltiev

12 goals

Viktor Zubarev

10 goals

Baktiyar Zaynutdinov

8 goals

Dmitry Byakov
Sergei Khizhnichenko

7 goals

Nurbol Zhumaskaliyev

6 goals

Igor Avdeyev
Islambek Kuat
Oleg Litvinenko
Sergei Ostapenko

5 goals

Abat Aimbetov
Andrei Finonchenko 
Yuriy Logvinenko
Kairat Nurdauletov

4 goals

Askhat Kadyrkulov
Maksim Shevchenko 
Gafurzhan Suyumbayev

3 goals

Bauyrzhan Dzholchiyev
Bolat Esmagambetov
Konstantin Gorovenka
Bauyrzhan Islamkhan
Andrei Karpovich
Alexei Klishin
Ulan Konysbayev
Vladimir Loginov
Yevgeniy Lunyov
Roman Murtazayev
Azat Nurgaliev
Tanat Nusserbayev
Aleksey Shchotkin
Daurenbek Tazhimbetov
Bauyrzhan Turysbek
Pavel Yevteyev

2 goals

Rinat Abdulin
Kairat Ashirbekov 
Ruslan Duzmambetov
Sergey Gridin
Aleksandr Kuchma 
Zhambyl Kukeyev
Nurken Mazbaev
Serikzhan Muzhikov
Maksim Nizovtsev
Oralkhan Omirtayev
Yerkebulan Seydakhmet
Dmitri Shomko
Samat Smakov
Murat Suyumagambetov
Roman Uzdenov
Ruslan Valiullin
Yan Vorogovskiy
Unknown

1 goals

Aybol Abiken
Askar Abildaev
Yuri Aksenov
Elkhan Astanov
Kairat Aubakirov
Bakhtiyar Baiseitov (footballer)
Maksat Baizhanov
Vencheslav Bogatyrev
Anton Chichulin
Aslan Darabayev
Viktor Dmitrenko
Aleksandr Familtsev
Maxim Fedin
Mikhail Gabyshev
Ruslan Imankulov
Oleg Kapustnikov
Daniar Kenzhekhanov
Andrey Kucheryavykh
Evgeniy Lovchev
Guram Makayev
Serhiy Malyi
Nurmat Mirzabayev
Daniyar Mukanov
Vladimir Niederhaus
Yuriy Pertsukh
Denis Rodionov
Heinrich Schmidtgal
Vitali Sparyshev
Yevgeni Tarasov
Murat Tleshev
Yerkebulan Tungyshbayev
Rafael Urazbakhtin
Valeriy Yablochkin
Temirlan Yerlanov
Vitali Yevstigneyev
Dmitri Yurist
Maksim Zhalmagambetov

Own goal

Sadiq Saadoun Abdul-Ridha (29 June 1997 vs Iraq)
Ismail Al-Ajmi (11 August 2010 vs Oman)
Josep Gómes (16 October 2018 vs Andorra)
Veaceslav Posmac (24 March 2022 vs Moldova)

See also
 Kazakhstani football clubs in international competitions

References

External links
Kazakhstan - List of International Matches - RSSSF.com
International Matches 1872-1880 and 1987-2004 Details - RSSSF.com (some statistics)

 
Results